Jessica Chase (born July 11, 1978) is a Canadian synchronized swimmer who competed in the Sydney and Athens Olympics.

Chase won a bronze medal at the team event at the 2000 Summer Olympics and at the 2001 world championships in Fukuoka, Japan.  Chase competed and finished fifth at the 2004 Summer Olympics in Athens with Canadian team.

References

1978 births
Living people
Synchronized swimmers at the 2000 Summer Olympics
Synchronized swimmers at the 2004 Summer Olympics
Olympic synchronized swimmers of Canada
Olympic bronze medalists for Canada
Swimmers from Montreal
Canadian synchronized swimmers
Olympic medalists in synchronized swimming
Medalists at the 2000 Summer Olympics
World Aquatics Championships medalists in synchronised swimming
Pan American Games medalists in synchronized swimming
Synchronized swimmers at the 1999 Pan American Games
Pan American Games gold medalists for Canada
Medalists at the 1999 Pan American Games
20th-century Canadian women
21st-century Canadian women